A Boston Landmark is a designation by the Boston Landmarks Commission for historic buildings and sites throughout the city of Boston based on the grounds that it has historical, social, cultural, architectural or aesthetic significance to New England or the United States. While National Landmark or National Register status can provide tax incentives for the owner of an income-producing property, local landmark status provides more control over modifications to a designated historic structure or place.

Criteria
For a group to start a designation procedure, they first meet with Boston Landmarks Commission staff to discuss the petition process. Once a complete petition is submitted, a preliminary hearing is scheduled to determine if the Commission will accept the petition for further study. If the Commission accepts the petition, the building or site is added to the pending Landmarks list. Preparation of a study report on the proposed Landmark is the next step. A public hearing process follows to present the draft study report. A 2/3 majority vote of the Commission is necessary for a property to be designated as a Boston Landmark. The decision must then be confirmed by the Mayor of Boston and by the Boston City Council. The Boston Landmarks Commission determines if a property is eligible for landmark status based on whether it
Is a site that represents some important aspect of cultural, political, economic, military, or social history
Is a site that has a significant association with an outstanding historic person
Is a notable work of an influential architect, landscape architect, designer, or builder
Represents elements of design with distinctive characteristics of a period, style or method of construction or development.

Once designated, any proposed alterations must be reviewed and approved by the Boston Landmarks Commission.

Recent designations 
In 2016, a commissioner submitted a petition to the Boston Landmarks Commission to designate the Citgo sign above Kenmore Square, when its support building at 660 Beacon Street was in the process of being sold by Boston University. The petition was accepted and the sign is a pending Landmark, with research for the study report underway.

Since two unrelated designations in 2016,  no pending landmarks have been approved. A number of sites have remained pending since the 1980s.

Demolished Boston Landmarks
The 1840 Roswell Gleason house in Dorchester was granted landmark status in 1977. It was destroyed by fire in 1982.

List of designated Boston Landmarks

References

External links
City of Boston, Boston Landmarks Commission
Boston Landmark Commission, Study reports for the designated landmarks
Old State House Museum 
Modern Theatre Shows
Isabella Stewart Gardner Museum

Buildings and structures in Boston